The Jarman Farm is a historic house in Lascassas, Tennessee, U.S.. It was built in 1850-1860 for Robert Hall Jarman, who owned 19 slaves by 1860. It was inherited by his son, Rufus E. Jarman, in 1884. It was later inherited by his granddaughter, who married Jack Penuel. The property includes several outbuildings and a cemetery. It has been listed on the National Register of Historic Places since July 6, 1987.

References

Houses on the National Register of Historic Places in Tennessee
Houses completed in 1855
Buildings and structures in Rutherford County, Tennessee